The 2014 Beijing ePrix, formally the 2014 FIA Formula E Evergrande Spring Beijing ePrix, was a Formula E motor race that was held on 13 September 2014 at the Beijing Olympic Green Circuit in Beijing, China. It was the first Championship race of the single-seater, electrically powered racing car series' inaugural season. The race was won by Lucas di Grassi for the Audi Sport ABT team, ahead of Franck Montagny and Sam Bird.

Report

Race
Nicolas Prost claimed pole position for the race for the e.dams-Renault team and, with the exception of one lap during the pit stops, led the race up until the final corner. That was the moment when Nick Heidfeld had closed the gap to Prost and made an overtaking manoeuvre. Prost hit Heidfeld while they were side to side, sending the German driver into a spin. Heidfeld's car then hit the kerb sideways, and flipped into the barrier. The collision forced both drivers to retire from the race, and Lucas di Grassi went through to claim victory. Montagny finished second, while Daniel Abt was third on track, but was penalised 57 seconds for exceeding "the maximum permitted electrical power during the race," relegating him to tenth position, which promoted Bird to the final place on the podium. Jaime Alguersuari and Katherine Legge also received 57-second penalties: Alguersuari for the same transgression, and Legge for a pit violation.

Despite his retirement, Prost collected three championship points for his pole position, and Takuma Sato, who was also unable to complete the race, gained two points for recording the fastest lap of the race. During the race, three drivers were able to gain benefit from a "fan boost" which gave them an extra 30 kilowatts of power for two five-second stints. The drivers voted to receive this were Bruno Senna, Legge, and Di Grassi. However, none of the drivers actually used the boost of energy during the race, leading the organization to mandate the use for coming races.

Classification

Qualifying

Notes:
 – Franck Montagny received a three-place grid penalty for entering the fast lane during qualifying before the green light.
 – Michela Cerruti, Ho-Pin Tung, Sébastien Buemi, Stéphane Sarrazin and Jarno Trulli each received a ten-place grid penalty for a gearbox change. Tung later opted to start from the pitlane.

Race

Notes:
 – Daniel Abt and Jaime Alguersuari each received a drive through penalty converted into a 57-second time penalty for exceeding the allowed battery usage limit of 208kW.
 - Katherine Legge received a drive through penalty converted into a 57-second time penalty for crossing the white lane at pit exit.
 – Three points for pole position.
 – Two points for fastest lap.

Standings after the race

Drivers' Championship standings

Teams' Championship standings

 Notes: Only the top five positions are included for both sets of standings.

References

External links
 FIA Formula E Results Beijing ePrix

|- style="text-align:center"
|width="35%"|Previous race:N/A
|width="30%"|FIA Formula E Championship2014–15 season
|width="35%"|Next race:2014 Putrajaya ePrix
|- style="text-align:center"
|width="35%"|Previous race:N/A
|width="30%"|Beijing ePrix
|width="35%"|Next race:2015 Beijing ePrix
|- style="text-align:center"

Beijing ePrix
Beijing ePrix
Beijing ePrix
Beijing ePrix